The sack of Wexford took place from 2 to 11 October 1649, during the campaign known as the Cromwellian conquest of Ireland. It was part of the wider 1641 to 1653 Irish Confederate Wars, and an associated conflict of the Wars of the Three Kingdoms.    

A Parliamentarian force under Oliver Cromwell stormed the town after negotiations broke down, killing most of the garrison. Many civilians also died, either during the sack, or drowned attempting to escape across the River Slaney. Along with Drogheda, Wexford is still remembered as an infamous atrocity.

Background

On 17 January 1649, the Catholic Confederation signed a treaty with the Duke of Ormond, Royalist leader in Ireland.  Two weeks later, they were joined by Ulster Presbyterians, who objected to the execution of Charles I by the newly established Commonwealth. This was offset when a faction under Ulster Catholic Eoghan Ó Néill agreed to a separate truce with Michael Jones, the Parliamentarian governor of Dublin. 

The Royalist/Confederate alliance sought to secure Ireland as a base for the new king, Charles II. Much of 1649 was spent trying to suppress Ó Néill, a factor in Jones' victory over Ormond at Rathmines in August. Although Ó Néill now began negotiations with Ormond, this enabled Oliver Cromwell and 12,000 English troops to land in Dublin unimpeded. At a Council of War held at Drogheda on 27 August, Ormond and his commanders agreed their best approach was to delay the Parliamentarians until winter, then rely on hunger and sickness to weaken them. 

The town was strongly held, and the policy reasonable enough, but failed to take into account Cromwell's large, modern artillery train. After a relatively short siege, Drogheda was captured on 11 September, and most of the garrison of 2,800 killed after refusing to surrender, although the extent of civilian casualties is disputed. Despite being within the then accepted rules of war, the number was unprecedented for the Wars of the Three Kingdoms; Cromwell admitted this was deliberate policy to reduce the likelihood of future resistance.  

Ormond retreated to the Confederate capital, Kilkenny; after detaching part of his force to attack Ó Néill, Cromwell left Dublin on 23 September. His target was the port of Wexford, a notorious base for Confederate privateers, which also provided a link with exiled Royalists in France. The Parliamentarian army was able to move far quicker than Ormond anticipated, since the bulk of their supplies and siege artillery were transported by a naval squadron under Richard Deane. 

Ormond despatched 1,000 men under David Synnot to garrison Wexford, and based his field army at New Ross, to protect its supply lines. Cromwell's force of around 6,000 arrived at the town on 2 October; two days later, a detachment led by Jones surprised the Royalist garrison of nearby Rosslare, giving Deane a secure harbour.

Siege

On arrival, Cromwell offered terms of surrender; he would allow the garrison to leave, without their weapons, and guaranteed the town would remain unharmed. Although acceptable to the civilian leadership, they were rejected by Synnot, who sought to delay as agreed at Drogheda; the rains had started, and dysentery was already endemic among the besiegers.     

While waiting for Deane to land his artillery, Cromwell exchanged a series of notes with Synnott, who was reinforced by 1,500 men from Viscount Iveagh's regiment on 5 October. Ormond had planned to relieve Wexford himself, before being forced to detach troops to Youghal when its Protestant Royalist garrison defected. However, another 600 men under Colonel Edward Butler entered the town. 

The guns opened fire early on 11 October, concentrating on the castle, which was held by a separate garrison, under Captain Nicholas Stafford.  Synnot promptly accepted the terms, but when his delegation met Cromwell, they made new demands; guarantees of religious freedom, the garrison retaining their weapons, and allowing the privateers currently in harbour to leave with their goods and ships intact. These were unacceptable, and Cromwell now lost patience.  

The artillery had breached the castle walls in two places, and when Cromwell's infantry began forming for an assault, Stafford surrendered. He failed to inform his colleagues, Synnot and Butler, who were taken by surprise, allowing the Parliamentarians to break into the town. In the sack that followed, between 1,500 to 2,000 soldiers and civilians died, over 300 of whom drowned escaping across the river; another 3,000 were taken prisoner, for the loss of only 20 Parliamentarians. 

Cromwell later defended this in his report to London, suggesting it was retribution for the killing of Protestants earlier in the rebellion, although he regretted the damage prevented him using Wexford for winter quarters. His personal responsibility is still a matter of debate; historians including Tom Reilly, Nicholas Canny, and Roger Hainsworth, suggest the assault was launched without his approval, and he was unable to control his troops once the plundering began. 

The war in Ireland was characterised by brutality on both sides; between 2,000 to 3,000 Scots and Ulster Presbyterians died in the pursuit that followed O'Neill's victory at Benburb in June 1646. Although the killings at Drogheda and Wexford were on a larger scale, Irish Catholics captured in England and Scotland, or taken at sea, were routinely executed throughout the war, including Philiphaugh in 1645, and Dunaverty in 1647. Attitudes in general had noticeably hardened; in the 1648 Second English Civil War, captured Royalist officers were often shot, and enlisted men shipped to the West Indies.

Aftermath
The loss of Wexford ended any chance of Charles II landing in Ireland; the Royalist fleet, commanded by Prince Rupert, now broke out of Kinsale, and headed for Lisbon. It also eliminated use of the port by privateers; the Parliamentarians claimed to have captured over 80, plus 100 fishing boats.   

Detaching so many troops to strengthen the garrison, who were then killed, captured or deserted, left Ormond fewer than 3,000 men, although this later increased to 7,000 by early November. Cromwell captured New Ross, then moved onto besiege Waterford, before being forced to retreat by sickness and lack of supplies. Between October to November, his army suffered over 1,000 deaths from disease, including senior officers such as Michael Jones and Thomas Horton. 

Despite this, the 1649 campaign was far more successful than anticipated, and seriously weakened the Royalist/Confederate alliance, composed as it was of factions with little in common. Religion generally prevailed over other motivations; in October, Protestant Royalists in Cork changed sides, followed by Lord Inchiquin, and the rest of Munster. In Ulster, Ó Néill's army remained on the sidelines until negotiations with Ormond were completed on 20 October; he died two weeks later, on 6 November. At the start of September, only Derry was held by those loyal to Parliament; by mid-December, they controlled the entire province, apart from Enniskillen.

Notes

References

Sources

Bibliography
 
 

 
 

Wexford 1649
Wexford 1649
1649 in Ireland
History of County Wexford
Military history of Ireland
Battles involving Ireland
Conflicts in 1649